The 2019–20 ISU Short Track Speed Skating World Cup was a multi-race tournament over a season for short track speed skating. The season began on 1 November 2019 in United States and ended on 14 February 2020 in Netherlands. The World Cup was organised by the ISU who also runs world cups and championships in speed skating and figure skating.

The World Cup consisted of six competitions this year.

Calendar

Men

Salt Lake City 1–3 November 2019

Montreal 8–10 November 2019

Nagoya 29 November–1 December 2019

Shanghai 6–8 December 2019

Dresden 7–9 February 2020

Dordrecht 14–16 February 2020

Women

Salt Lake City 1–3 November 2019

Montreal 8–10 November 2019

Nagoya 29 November–1 December 2019

Shanghai 6–8 December 2019

Dresden 7–9 February 2020

Dordrecht 14–16 February 2020

Mixed

Salt Lake City 1–3 November 2019

Montreal 8–10 November 2019

Nagoya 29 November–1 December 2019

Shanghai 6–8 December 2019

Dresden 7–9 February 2020

Dordrecht 14–16 February 2020

World Cup standings

See also
 2020 World Short Track Speed Skating Championships
 2020 Four Continents Short Track Speed Skating Championships
 2020 European Short Track Speed Skating Championships

Notes

References

External links 
 ISU.org World Cup Schedule
 Official results

ISU Short Track Speed Skating World Cup
Isu Short Track Speed Skating World Cup, 2019–20
Isu Short Track Speed Skating World Cup, 2019–20